Mount Supernal is a large double summit mountain surmounting the southeast corner of Hercules Neve and the heads of the Gair and Meander Glaciers, in Victoria Land, Antarctica. The feature has at times been mistaken for Mount Murchison. Named by the northern party of New Zealand Geological Survey Antarctic Expedition (NZGSAE), 1962–63, because of its prominent and lofty appearance.

See also
 List of Ultras of Antarctica

References

External links
 "Mount Supernal, Antarctica"

Mountains of Victoria Land
Mountaineer Range
Borchgrevink Coast